Terebra robusta, common name robust auger, is a species of sea snail, a marine gastropod mollusc in the family Terebridae, the auger snails.

Description
Terebra robusta has a shell reaching a length of 30 – 155 mm and a diameter of about 34 mm. The surface of this large shell ranges from whitish to beige, with brown spots along the spirals.

Distribution
This species can be found in Baja California, from Mexico to Peru and in Galápagos. It lives commonly at a depth of about  90 m.

References

External links
 Natural History Museum Rotterdam
 

Terebridae
Gastropods described in 1844